The Farglory International Center is a 26-story,  skyscraper office building completed in 1989 in Xinyi District, Taipei, Taiwan. The building is similar in design to 50 Fremont Center in San Francisco, United States and housed the corporate headquarters of Farglory Group before the completion of Farglory Financial Center in 2012.

See also 
 List of tallest buildings in Taiwan
 List of tallest buildings in Taipei

References

1989 establishments in Taiwan
Skyscraper office buildings in Taipei
Office buildings completed in 1989